Woman's Club of Newport, also known as Newport Town Hall, is a historic clubhouse located at Newport, New Castle County, Delaware.  It was built in 1934, and is a one-story,
T-plan building in the Tudor Revival style. It has a three-bay-wide, two-bay-deep, gable roofed main block with a broad wing extend to the rear, resulting in a T configuration. The roof of the wing is slightly higher than that of the front section, and terminates in a clipped "jerkinhead" gable.  Originally built for the Woman's Club of Newport, in 1976, the clubhouse was sold to the Town of Newport for use as a town hall.

It was added to the National Register of Historic Places in 1993.

References

City and town halls in Delaware
Clubhouses on the National Register of Historic Places in Delaware
Tudor Revival architecture in Delaware
Cultural infrastructure completed in 1934
Buildings and structures in New Castle County, Delaware
National Register of Historic Places in New Castle County, Delaware
1934 establishments in Delaware
History of women in Delaware